Peltastes is a genus of flowering plants in the family Apocynaceae, first described as a genus in 1932. It is native to Central and South America.

Species

References

Apocynaceae genera
Echiteae